Church Street  is an electoral ward of the City of Westminster. The population at the 2011 Census was 11,760. The ward covers the eponymous street market and the surrounding area of Lisson Grove, to the north of the Edgware Road. The area is currently the focus of regeneration plans by the council.

The ward returns three councillors to Westminster City Council, with an election every four years. At the last election in May 2022, Matt Noble, Aicha Less and Abdul Toki, all candidates from the Labour Party, were elected to represent the ward.

Since the ward was created for the formation of the council in 1965, it has usually elected Labour councillors, with most results indicating a safe seat for the party. The sole occasion another party represented the ward was following the by-election of 24 July 2008, when a seat was won by a Conservative candidate for the first and only time to date, beating Labour's candidate Dave Rowntree, the drummer from the band Blur. The seat was regained by Labour at the subsequent council election in May 2010, held on the same day as the general election.

Previous councillors elected for the area include the Dowager Countess of Lucan, barrister and current QC Gavin Millar, and subsequent London Assembly AM Murad Qureshi.

Election results 
Like the other wards of Westminster, Church Street is represented by three councillors on Westminster City Council. The last election was held on 5 May 2022, when all three councillors were elected. All three currently represent the Labour Party.

2022 election

2018 election

Results are compared with the 2014 council election, not the 2016 by-election.

2016 by-election

The by-election was called following the resignation of Cllr. Vincenzo Rampulla.

2014 election

References

Westminster Council ward councillor details.

External links
Westminster Conservative Party
Westminster Labour Party

Wards in the City of Westminster
District centres of London